In Greek mythology, Oileus or Oïleus (Oī̈leús) was the king of Locris, and an Argonaut.

Family 
Oileus's father was given as Hodoedocus (whom Oileus succeeded as King of Locris) and his mother as Agrianome (daughter of Perseon), according to Hyginus's Fabulae. Oileus is best known as the father of Ajax the Lesser. There is disagreement as to the name of Ajax's mother: Homer names Eriopis as the legal wife of Oileus, but scholiasts cite other authors, some of whom agreed with Homer in considering Eriopis (or Eriope) the mother of Ajax, but others stated that the mother of Ajax by Oileus was Alcimache, and yet others asserted that Alcimache was simply another name for Eriopis. John Tzetzes listed three alternate options: Eriopis, Alcimache, or Astyoche the daughter of Itylus. Oileus was also the father of Medon, who is usually regarded as illegitimate; Medon's mother was said to be a nymph named Rhene, though some gave Alcimache as his mother. According to Hyginus, Rhene was the mother of Ajax as well.

Mythology 
In Apollonius Rhodius' Argonautica, Oileus gets wounded in the shoulder during the attack of the Stymphalian Birds on the Argo and receives aid from Eribotes.

Oileus was also the name of a defender of Troy, the charioteer of Bienor, killed by Agamemnon.

Notes

References 

 Apollonius Rhodius, Argonautica translated by Robert Cooper Seaton (1853-1915), R. C. Loeb Classical Library Volume 001. London, William Heinemann Ltd, 1912. Online version at the Topos Text Project.
 Apollonius Rhodius, Argonautica. George W. Mooney. London. Longmans, Green. 1912. Greek text available at the Perseus Digital Library.
 Gaius Valerius Flaccus, Argonautica translated by Mozley, J H. Loeb Classical Library Volume 286. Cambridge, MA, Harvard University Press; London, William Heinemann Ltd. 1928. Online version at theoi.com.
 Gaius Valerius Flaccus, Argonauticon. Otto Kramer. Leipzig. Teubner. 1913. Latin text available at the Perseus Digital Library.
 Homer, The Iliad with an English Translation by A.T. Murray, Ph.D. in two volumes. Cambridge, MA., Harvard University Press; London, William Heinemann, Ltd. 1924. . Online version at the Perseus Digital Library.
 Homer, Homeri Opera in five volumes. Oxford, Oxford University Press. 1920. . Greek text available at the Perseus Digital Library.
 The Orphic Argonautica, translated by Jason Colavito. © Copyright 2011. Online version at the Topos Text Project.
 Pausanias, Description of Greece with an English Translation by W.H.S. Jones, Litt.D., and H.A. Ormerod, M.A., in 4 Volumes. Cambridge, MA, Harvard University Press; London, William Heinemann Ltd. 1918. . Online version at the Perseus Digital Library
 Pausanias, Graeciae Descriptio. 3 vols. Leipzig, Teubner. 1903.  Greek text available at the Perseus Digital Library.
 Tzetzes, John, Allegories of the Iliad translated by Goldwyn, Adam J. and Kokkini, Dimitra. Dumbarton Oaks Medieval Library, Harvard University Press, 2015. 

Argonauts
Kings in Greek mythology
Characters in the Argonautica
Locrian characters in Greek mythology